This is a list of South Korean billionaires based on an annual assessment of wealth and assets compiled and published by Forbes magazines in 2022.

2022 South Korean billionaires list

See also
 The World's Billionaires
 List of countries by the number of billionaires

References

Lists of people by wealth
Net worth
 
Net worth
Economy of South Korea-related lists